A List of B roads in Northern Ireland.

Routes are listed proceeding North to South or East to West as appropriate.

References

Roads in Ireland
 
Roa
Northern Ireland
Nor